Carlos de Jesus Euzébio, known as Euzébio, (16 November 1951 – 11 March 2010) was a Brazilian football striker.

Career
Born in Santa Bárbara d'Oeste, Euzébio began playing football with hometown União Agrícola Barbarense Futebol Clube. He played one season with now-defunct  Esporte Clube Vasco da Gama in Americana, São Paulo before joining Santos Futebol Clube in 1972. He won the Campeonato Paulista with Santos in 1973.

Euzébio moved to Mexico in 1974, joining newly promoted Leones Negros. He would spend 10 years playing in the Mexican Primera División with Leones Negros, CF Monterrey and Club León. In 1985, he returned to Brazil where he finished his career with União Barbarense.

Personal
Euzébio died in an automobile accident in his hometown of Santa Bárbara d'Oeste at age 58.

References

External links

1951 births
2010 deaths
Brazilian footballers
Brazilian expatriate footballers
União Agrícola Barbarense Futebol Clube players
Santos FC players
C.F. Monterrey players
Club León footballers
Liga MX players
Expatriate footballers in Mexico
Association football forwards